Englishman is an album by Jamaican dancehall musician Barrington Levy, released in 1979 (see 1979 in music).  A relaxed, sultry album, Englishman was one of Levy's most popular albums, especially outside of Jamaica. The Roots Radics provided the rhythm tracks.

Track listing
"Englishman" (Lawes) – 3:31
"If You Give to Me" (Levy) – 3:58
"Sister Carol" (Levy) – 3:52
"Don't Fuss nor Fight" (Lawes, Levy) – 2:36
"Look Girl" (Levy) – 3:11
"Look Youthman" (Levy) – 3:12
"Send a Moses" (Lawes) – 3:32
"Black Heart Man" (Lawes) – 4:15
"Money Makes Friends" (Lawes) – 3:59
"Bend Your Back" (Lawes) – 3:24

Personnel
Barrington Levy - vocals
Earl "Chinna" Smith - lead guitar
Winston "Bo-Pee" Bowen - rhythm guitar
Errol "Flabba" Holt - bass
Carlton "Santa" Davis - drums
Gladstone Anderson - keyboards
Christopher "Sky Juice" Blake - percussion
Prince Jammy, Scientist - engineers

References

Barrington Levy albums
1979 albums
Greensleeves Records albums